The men's open category competition in judo at the 1984 Summer Olympics in Los Angeles was held on 11 August at the California State University. The gold medal was won by Yasuhiro Yamashita of Japan.

In his only appearance at the Olympics, four-time world champion Yasuhiro Yamashita tore a right calf muscle in the preliminary match against Arthur Schnabel. This put Yamashita at a huge disadvantage since he executed his throws by pivoting on his right leg. Though he managed to win the match with an Okuri-Eri-Jime, the injury caused him to visibly limp during the semi-final match against Laurent Del Colombo. Yamashita was thrown with an Osoto Gari only 30 seconds into the match, but managed to return an Osoto Gari and won the match with a Yoko-Shiho-Gatame (side four-quarter hold). He played the final match against Mohamed Ali Rashwan of Egypt. Yamashita won the final and the gold medal despite his injury. The match witnessed a remarkable fair play act from Rashwan who did not aim for Yamashita's right leg. Rashwan was even given an award from the International Fairplay Committee.

Results

Pool A

Pool B

Repechages

Final

Final classification

References

Judo at the 1984 Summer Olympics
Judo at the Summer Olympics Men's Openweight